1060 Magnolia, provisional designation , is a stony Florian asteroid from the inner regions of the asteroid belt, approximately 7 kilometers in diameter. It was discovered on 13 August 1925, by German astronomer Karl Reinmuth at the Heidelberg-Königstuhl State Observatory. The asteroid was named after the flowering plant magnolia.

Orbit and classification 

Magnolia is a member of the Flora family, a giant asteroid family and the largest family of stony asteroids in the main-belt. It orbits the Sun in the inner asteroid belt at a distance of 1.8–2.7 AU once every 3 years and 4 months (1,222 days; semi-major axis of 2.24 AU). Its orbit has an eccentricity of 0.20 and an inclination of 6° with respect to the ecliptic.

The body's observation arc begins at Heidelberg in September 1925, or one month after its official discovery observation.

Physical characteristics 

Pan-STARRS photometric survey characterizes Magnolia as a common, stony S-type asteroid, which is also the overall spectral type for members of the Flora family.

Rotation period 

Several rotational lightcurves of Magnolia have been obtained from photometric observations since 1992. The best-rated lightcurve by French amateur astronomers Jacques Michelet and Maurice Audejean gave a relatively short rotation period of 2.9107 hours with a brightness amplitude of 0.14 magnitude.

Diameter and albedo 

According to the survey carried out by the NEOWISE mission of NASA's Wide-field Infrared Survey Explorer (WISE), Magnolia measures between 5.23 and 9.65 kilometers in diameter and its surface has an albedo between 0.173 and 0.47.

The Collaborative Asteroid Lightcurve Link adopts Petr Pravec's revised WISE results, that is, an albedo of 0.2839 and a diameter of 7.16 kilometers based on an absolute magnitude of 12.71.

Naming 

This minor planet was named after a genus of flowering plants, magnolia, which was in turn named after Pierre Magnol. The official naming citation was mentioned in The Names of the Minor Planets by Paul Herget in 1955.

Reinmuth's flowers 

Due to his many discoveries, Karl Reinmuth submitted a large list of 66 newly named asteroids in the early 1930s. This list also contained a sequence of 28 asteroids, starting with 1054 Forsytia, that were all named after plants, in particular flowering plants (also see list of minor planets named after animals and plants).

References

External links 
 Asteroid Lightcurve Database (LCDB), query form (info )
 Dictionary of Minor Planet Names, Google books
 Asteroids and comets rotation curves, CdR – Observatoire de Genève, Raoul Behrend
 Discovery Circumstances: Numbered Minor Planets (1)-(5000) – Minor Planet Center
 
 

001060
Discoveries by Karl Wilhelm Reinmuth
Named minor planets
19250813